Aktuna is a Turkish surname. Notable people with the surname include:

 Ercan Aktuna (1940–2013), Turkish footballer
 Yıldırım Aktuna (1930–2007), Turkish psychiatrist

Turkish-language surnames